Louis Marianne is a French professional football manager.

In 1983–1985 he was a coach of the Martinique national football team with Marcel Pujar. Since 2014 he again coached the Martinique national football team.

References

External links

Year of birth missing (living people)
Living people
French football managers
Martinique national football team managers
Place of birth missing (living people)
2017 CONCACAF Gold Cup managers